The Pulitzer Prize for Commentary is an award administered by the Columbia University Graduate School of Journalism "for distinguished commentary, using any available journalistic tool". It is one of the fourteen American Pulitzer Prizes that are annually awarded for Journalism. It has been presented since 1970. Finalists have been announced from 1980, ordinarily with two others beside the winner.

Winners and citations
The Commentary Pulitzer has been awarded to one person annually without exception—45 prizes in 44 years 1970–2014. No person has won it twice.

The New York Times and the Washington Post/Washington Post Writers Group are the media outlets associated with the most winners of the Pulitzer Prize for Commentary, with nine recipients each.

 1970: Marquis W. Childs, St. Louis Post-Dispatch, "distinguished commentary during 1969."
 1971: William A. Caldwell, The Record (Hackensack, New Jersey), "for his commentary in his daily column."
 1972: Mike Royko, Chicago Daily News, "for his columns during 1971." 
 1973: David S. Broder, Washington Post, "for his columns during 1972." 
 1974: Edwin A. Roberts Jr., National Observer, "for his commentary on public affairs during 1973." 
 1975: Mary McGrory, Washington Star, "for her commentary on public affairs during 1974."
 1976: Walter Wellesley (Red) Smith, New York Times, "for his commentary on sports in 1975 and for many other years."
 1977: George F. Will, Washington Post Writers Group, for distinguished commentary on a variety of topics."
 1978: William Safire, New York Times, "for commentary on the Bert Lance affair. 
 1979: Russell Baker, New York Times
 1980: Ellen H. Goodman, Boston Globe
 1981: Dave Anderson, New York Times, "for his commentary on sports." 
 1982: Art Buchwald, Los Angeles Times Syndicate
 1983: Claude Sitton, Raleigh (N. C.) News & Observer 
 1984: Vermont C. Royster, Wall Street Journal, 
 1985: Murray Kempton, Newsday, Long Island, N.Y., "for witty and insightful reflection on public issues in 1984 and throughout a distinguished career." 
 1986: Jimmy Breslin, New York Daily News, "for columns which consistently champion ordinary citizens." 
 1987: Charles Krauthammer, Washington Post Writers Group, "for his witty and insightful columns on national issues."
 1988: Dave Barry, Miami Herald, "for his consistently effective use of humor as a device for presenting fresh insights into serious concerns." 
 1989: Clarence Page, Chicago Tribune, "for his provocative columns on local and national affairs."
 1990: Jim Murray, Los Angeles Times, "for his sports columns." 
 1991: Jim Hoagland, Washington Post, "for searching and prescient columns on events leading up to the Gulf War and on the political problems of Mikhail Gorbachev."
 1992: Anna Quindlen, New York Times, "for her compelling columns on a wide range of personal and political topics."
 1993: Liz Balmaseda, Miami Herald, "for her commentary from Haiti about deteriorating political and social conditions and her columns about Cuban-Americans in Miami."
 1994: William Raspberry, Washington Post, "for his compelling commentaries on a variety of social and political topics." 
 1995: Jim Dwyer, Newsday, Long Island, N.Y., for his compelling and compassionate columns about New York City. 
 1996: E. R. Shipp, New York Daily News, for her penetrating columns on race, welfare and other social issues. 
 1997: Eileen McNamara, Boston Globe, "for her many-sided columns on Massachusetts people and issues."
 1998: Mike McAlary, New York Daily News, "for reporting on the brutalization of a Haitian immigrant by police officers at a Brooklyn stationhouse."
 1999: Maureen Dowd, New York Times, "for her fresh and insightful columns on the impact of President Clinton's affair with Monica Lewinsky." 
 2000: Paul A. Gigot, Wall Street Journal, "for his informative and insightful columns on politics and government."
 2001: Dorothy Rabinowitz, Wall Street Journal, "for her articles on American society and culture."
 2002: Thomas Friedman, New York Times, "for his clarity of vision, based on extensive reporting, in commenting on the worldwide impact of the terrorist threat."
 2003: Colbert I. King, Washington Post, "for his against-the-grain columns that speak to people in power with ferocity and wisdom."
 2004: Leonard Pitts, Miami Herald, "for his fresh, vibrant columns that spoke, with both passion and compassion, to ordinary people on often divisive issues."
 2005: Connie Schultz, Plain Dealer, Cleveland, "for her pungent columns that provided a voice for the underdog and underprivileged."
 2006: Nicholas D. Kristof, New York Times, "for his graphic, deeply reported columns that, at personal risk, focused attention on genocide in Darfur and that gave voice to the voiceless in other parts of the world."
 2007: Cynthia Tucker, Atlanta Journal-Constitution, "for her courageous, clear-headed columns that evince a strong sense of morality and persuasive knowledge of the community."
 2008: Steven Pearlstein, Washington Post, "for his insightful columns that explore the nation's complex economic ills with masterful clarity."
 2009: Eugene Robinson, Washington Post, "for his eloquent columns on the 2008 presidential campaign that focus on the election of the first African-American president, showcasing graceful writing and grasp of the larger historic picture." 
 2010: Kathleen Parker, Washington Post, "for her perceptive, often witty columns on an array of political and moral issues."
 2011: David Leonhardt, New York Times, "for his graceful penetration of America’s complicated economic questions, from the federal budget deficit to health care reform."
 2012: Mary Schmich, Chicago Tribune, "for her wide range of down-to-earth columns that reflect the character and capture the culture of her famed city."
 2013: Bret Stephens, Wall Street Journal, "for his incisive columns on American foreign policy and domestic politics, often enlivened by a contrarian twist."
 2014: Stephen Henderson, Detroit Free Press, "for his columns on the financial crisis facing his hometown, written with passion and a stirring sense of place, sparing no one in their critique."
 2015: Lisa Falkenberg, Houston Chronicle, "for vividly-written, groundbreaking columns about grand jury abuses that led to a wrongful conviction and other egregious problems in the legal and immigration systems."
 2016: Farah Stockman, Boston Globe, "for extensively reported columns that probe the legacy of busing in Boston and its effect on education in the city with a clear eye on ongoing racial contradictions."
 2017: Peggy Noonan, Wall Street Journal "for rising to the moment with beautifully rendered columns that connected readers to the shared virtues of Americans during one of the nation’s most divisive political campaigns."
 2018: John Archibald, Alabama Media Group "for lyrical and courageous commentary that is rooted in Alabama but has a national resonance in scrutinizing corrupt politicians, championing the rights of women and calling out hypocrisy."
 2019: Tony Messenger, St. Louis Post Dispatch "for bold columns that exposed the malfeasance and injustice of forcing poor rural Missourians charged with misdemeanor crimes to pay unaffordable fines or be sent to jail."
 2020: Nikole Hannah-Jones, The New York Times, "for a sweeping, deeply reported and personal essay for the ground-breaking 1619 Project, which seeks to place the enslavement of Africans at the center of America’s story, prompting public conversation about the nation’s founding and evolution."
 2021: Michael Paul Williams, Richmond Times-Dispatch, "for penetrating and historically insightful columns that guided Richmond, a former capital of the Confederacy, through the painful and complicated process of dismantling the city's monuments to white supremacy."
2022: Melinda Henneberger of The Kansas City Star, "For persuasive columns demanding justice for alleged victims of a retired police detective accused of being a sexual predator."

References

Commentary
Opinion journalism
Awards established in 1970